"Trip Switch" is a song by British alternative rock band Nothing but Thieves. It was produced by Julian Emery and was released as a single from the band's self-titled album on 18 June 2015. It topped the Billboard Alternative Songs chart in 2016.

Background and composition
According to the main composer of the song, guitarist Joe Brown, the lyrics are a social comment on the modern world. Also the song served as an inspiration for the album art.

Music video
The official music video was released on 1 July 2015.

Charts

Weekly charts

Year-end charts

References

2015 songs
2015 singles
RCA Records singles
Nothing but Thieves songs
Songs written by Jim Irvin
Songs written by Julian Emery